Gino Belloni (20 September 1884 – 22 January 1924) was an Italian fencer. He competed in the team sabre event at the 1912 Summer Olympics.

References

1884 births
1924 deaths
Sportspeople from Cremona
Italian male fencers
Olympic fencers of Italy
Fencers at the 1912 Summer Olympics